During the 1995–96 Italian football season, F.C. Internazionale Milano competed in Serie A.

Season summary
Inter continued to languish quite far back from the top teams, finishing an unspectacular seventh in the domestic league competition. Despite a reigniting of the team under Roy Hodgson, poached away from Switzerland's national team, Inter was unable to claim a European slot on merit, and was only awarded a UEFA Cup slot thanks to Juventus winning the Champions League.

Prior to the season had Inter made three important signings, with Paul Ince, Roberto Carlos and Javier Zanetti all joining the club. While Ince and Roberto Carlos would leave the club in a few seasons, Zanetti would be a stalwart for Inter in years to come, captaining the team in the 2010 UEFA Champions League Final, 15 years on from his signing.

Squad

Transfers

In

 (November)

 (January)

Out

 (November)

 (January)

Competitions

Serie A

League table

Results by round

Matches

Coppa Italia

Second round

Eightfinals

Quarterfinals

Semifinals

UEFA Cup

First round

Statistics

Players statistics

Goalscorers
  Marco Branca 17
  Maurizio Ganz 13
  Roberto Carlos 5
  Paul Ince 3

References

Sources
  RSSSF - Italy 1995/96

Inter Milan seasons
Internazionale